Silence in the Forest is a 1976 West German historical drama film directed by Alfred Vohrer and starring Alexander Stephan, Belinda Mayne and Evelyn Opela.

It is a heimatfilm, one of the last productions in the group of films produced in post-war Germany. It is based on Ludwig Ganghofer's novel of the same title which has been adapted for the screen several time.

Cast
 Alexander Stephan as Götz Graf Ettingen
 Belinda Mayne as Lore Petri
 Evelyn Opela as Baronin Prankha
 Ferdy Mayne as Baron Sternfeld
 Walter Buschhoff as Sensburg
 Marius Aicher
 Sky du Mont
 Georg Einerdinger
 Bernhard Helfrich as Praxmaler
 Kathi Leitner
 Sepp Löffler as Kluibenschädl
 Edwige Pierre
 Ludwig Schmid-Wildy
 Erni Singerl
 Christian Vonderthann
 Hans Vonderthann

References

Bibliography 
 Goble, Alan. The Complete Index to Literary Sources in Film. Walter de Gruyter, 1999.

External links 
 

1976 films
West German films
1970s German-language films
Films directed by Alfred Vohrer
Films based on works by Ludwig Ganghofer
Films set in the 1890s
Films set in the Alps
Films set in forests
German historical drama films
1970s historical drama films
Constantin Film films
Terra Film films
1976 drama films
1970s German films